Maarten Schakel Jr. (born January 5, 1947 in Noordeloos) is a Dutch politician for the CDA.

On May 1, 1982, he became mayor of Lopik, but due to his condition on June 1, 2008, Schakel took early retirement.

References

1947 births
Living people
Christian Democratic Appeal politicians
Mayors in Utrecht (province)
People from Giessenlanden